One Thousand and One Nights, or Arabian Nights, is a collection of Middle Eastern and South Asian stories and folk tales compiled in Arabic during the Islamic Golden Age.

One Thousand and One Nights or 1001 Nights may also refer to:

Film and television 
 One Thousand and One Nights (Alf Laila Wa Laila, ألف ليلة وليلة), an Egyptian television series; see Yehia El-Fakharany
 Binbir Gece (English: Thousand and One Nights) (2006–2009), a Turkish television series
 One Thousand and One Nights of Erotic Fantasy, a South Korean television series; see Song Jae-hee
 Le mille e una notte: Aladino e Sherazade (One Thousand and One Nights), a 2012 Italian television series; see Marco Bocci

Literature
 Les mille et une nuits, a French translation of The Thousand and One Nights by Antoine Galland
 The Book of the Thousand Nights and a Night, Sir Richard Burton's famous translation of the Arabian Nights 
 The Supplemental Nights to the Thousand Nights and a Night, an English translation by Sir Richard Burton 
 One Hundred and One Nights (book), a book of Arab literature consisting of twenty stories which presents many similarities to the more famous One Thousand and One Nights
 Le livre des mille nuits et une nuit, a French translation of One Thousand and One Nights by J.C. Mardrus
 One Thousand and One Nights' Story (Senya Ichiya Monogatari), a manga series written by Monkey Punch
 One Thousand and One Nights (manhwa), a Korean boys-love comic

Other uses
 "Alf Leila We Leila" (One Thousand and One Nights), a single by Assala Nasri
 Sonic and the Secret Rings (also known as the Arabian Nights), a 2007 Sonic the Hedgehog video game

See also
 A Thousand and One Nights (disambiguation) 
 Arabian Nights (disambiguation) 
 1001 Nights (disambiguation)
 Kampfgruppe 1001 Nights, German combat formation during World War II